State Route 131 (SR 131), named Tiburon Boulevard along its entire length, is a state highway in the U.S. state of California in Marin County. It is a short route that connects U.S. Route 101 with the town of Tiburon.

Route description
The route follows the northern and eastern shorelines of Richardson Bay, an inlet of San Francisco Bay north of Sausalito.  Approximately the first half of the route is four-lane divided road, until it reaches the site of the old railroad trestle and Blackie's Pasture, after which it narrows to two lanes on Tiburon Peninsula heading into Tiburon.

Beyond its western terminus at U.S. 101, Tiburon Boulevard becomes East Blithedale Avenue, which leads into Mill Valley. Its eastern terminus is at the intersection with Main Street in Tiburon, after which the road becomes Paradise Drive, a winding route which loops around the eastern side of Tiburon Peninsula, eventually leading to Corte Madera.

SR 131 is part of the National Highway System, a network of highways that are considered essential to the country's economy, defense, and mobility by the Federal Highway Administration.

History
Route 131 is part of the state highway system maintained by Caltrans because it was part of a larger plan in the 1950s to construct another bridge to San Francisco via Angel Island to complement the Golden Gate Bridge.

Major intersections

See also

References

External links

Caltrans: Route 131 road conditions
California @ AARoads.com - State Route 131
California Highways: SR 131

State highways in California
Streets in Marin County, California
Tiburon, California